Kushk Sar (also Romanized as Kūshk Sār and Kūshk-e Sār) is a village in Pol Beh Pain Rural District, Simakan District, Jahrom County, Fars Province, Iran. At the 2006 census, its population was 694, in 150 families.

References 

Populated places in Jahrom County